Antonio Aquilanti (born 8 November 1985) is an Italian footballer.

Career
Aquilanti started his professional career at Pescara Calcio, also in Abruzzo.

He was signed by Fiorentina in co-ownership deal, in summer 2004, played with their Primavera team.

Aquilanti return to Pescara on loan in summer 2005, and Pescara bought back him in June 2006. That month Pescara also bought Andrea De Falco from la viola.

After Pescara relegated to Serie C1, in August 2007, he was signed by Ascoli on a 3-year deal.

In August 2008, he was loaned to Benevento.

In 2009, he joined the Pro Patria and left for Lanciano on 1 February 2010, signed a contract until 30 June 2012.

He left for Cosenza on 31 January 2011.

On 16 August 2019, he signed with Rieti.

International career
He was the member of Italian U-20 team at 2005 FIFA World Youth Championship.

References

External links

1985 births
Living people
People from Lanciano
Italian footballers
Italy youth international footballers
Serie B players
Serie C players
Delfino Pescara 1936 players
ACF Fiorentina players
Ascoli Calcio 1898 F.C. players
Cosenza Calcio players
Benevento Calcio players
Aurora Pro Patria 1919 players
S.S. Virtus Lanciano 1924 players
A.S.D. Sicula Leonzio players
F.C. Rieti players
Association football defenders
Sportspeople from the Province of Chieti
Footballers from Abruzzo